John Kevin Coleman (born 1944) is an Irish former hurler and politician. At club level he played with Ballinhassig, divisional side Carrigdhoun and was also a member of the Cork senior hurling team. Coleman also spent some time as an elected representative with Cork County Council.

Playing career
Coleman first played hurling at juvenile and underage levels with the Ballinhassig club while also lining out with St. Finbarr's College in the Harty Cup. He progressed to adult club level, alongside his six brothers, and enjoyed a hugely successful career, winning five Carrigdhoun JFC titles, two Cork JHC titles and two Cork IHC titles. Coleman also lined out with divisional side Carrigdhoun.

Coleman first appeared on the inter-county scene with Cork as a member of the minor team in 1962. He later spent one season with the under-21 team, however, his underage career ended without success.  Coleman was a member of the intermediate team that won the All-Ireland IHC title in 1965. He was drafted onto the senior team that same year and made a number of appearances in the National League over subsequent seasons. Coleman made his only championship appearance when he came on as a substitute in Cork's defeat by Tipperary in the 1968 Munster final.

Political career
Coleman was elected to Cork County Council as a Fianna Fáil candidate in the 1985 local elections. He later left the party, joined the Progressive Democrats and was an unsuccessful candidate in the 1989 general election in the Cork South Central constituency. Coleman lost his council seat at the 1991 local elections.

Honours
'''St Finbarrs College
All-ireland Colleges Senior Hurling Championship : (1) 1963
 Munster Colleges Senior Hurling Championship: (1) 1963
Ballinhassig
Cork Intermediate Hurling Championship: 1975, 1977
Cork Junior Hurling Championship: 1965, 1973
South East Junior A Hurling Championship: 1964, 1965, 1970, 1971, 1973

Cork
All-Ireland Intermediate Hurling Championship: 1965 
Munster Intermediate Hurling Championship: 1965, 1967

References

1944 births
Living people
Ballinhassig hurlers
Carrigdhoun hurlers
Cork inter-county hurlers
Irish sportsperson-politicians